Viviane Artigalas (born 22 October 1956) is a French politician of the Socialist Party. She became a senator for Hautes-Pyrénées in October 2017.

Career
Artigalas started her political career as a municipal councillor of Milly-la-Forêt, Essonne. She was elected mayor of Arrens-Marsous, Hautes-Pyrénées in 2012 and re-elected in 2014. She was the deputy chairwoman of the Val d'Azun community of communes from 2008 to 2016, then a member of the Pyrénées Vallées des Gaves community of communes in 2017. Besides, she was a regional councillor of Midi-Pyrénées between 2010 and 2015 and became the deputy chairwoman of the Midi-Pyrénées Regional Council.

She stood in the 2011 cantonal election in the canton of Aucun but was defeated by Marc Léo.

On 24 September 2017 she was elected a senator for Hautes-Pyrénées. She was appointed as the secretary of the Commission for Economic Affairs.

She supported candidate Ségolène Royal in the 2007 presidential election.

References

External links
Viviane Artigalas, French Senate official website 
Viviane Artigalas, NosSénateurs.fr 

21st-century French women politicians
Women mayors of places in France
Regional councillors of France
French Senators of the Fifth Republic
Senators of Hautes-Pyrénées
Women members of the Senate (France)
Politicians from Occitania (administrative region)
Socialist Party (France) politicians
1956 births
Living people